Qanlikól (Karakalpak: Қанлыкөл, Qanlıkól) is a town and seat of Qanlikól district in Karakalpakstan. The town population in 1989 was 7,303 people.

References

Populated places in Karakalpakstan
Urban-type settlements in Uzbekistan